Władysław Gerard Jan Nepomuk Marya Moes (17 November 1900 – 17 December 1986) was a Polish landowner and has been claimed as the inspiration for the character Tadzio in Thomas Mann’s novella Death in Venice, which was filmed as Death in Venice by Luchino Visconti.

Early life
Władysław Moes was born in the Moes Palace near Wierbka, in southern Poland. He was the second son of the six children of Aleksander Juliusz Moes (1856–1928), a large landowner, factory owner and philanthropist, and his wife noblewoman Janina Miączyńska (1869–1946), whose family used the Suchekomnaty coat of arms. He was also the grandson of Christian August Moes (1810–1872), a Polish industrialist of Dutch origin.

In May 1911, on the advice of doctors, he spent a spring holiday with his family at the Lido in Venice, staying at the Grand Hotel des Bains. There, he attracted the attention of the German writer Thomas Mann, who used him as the inspiration for Tadzio – a character of his novella Death in Venice, published in 1912.

Katia Mann recalled that her husband's idea for the story came during a holiday at the Grand Hôtel des Bains in 1911: 

Moes was taught by private tutors and later studied at Saint Stanislaus Kostka's Gymnasium in Warsaw. In 1920, Moes was a volunteer uhlan in the Polish-Soviet War. Later, he ran a landed estate and a horse farm in Udórz that he inherited from his father, who died in 1928.

Marriage and later life
In 1935, he married a noblewoman – Anna Belina-Brzozowska (1911–1978), whose family used the Belina coat of arms. They had two children, Aleksander (1936–1955) and Maria (born 1946). He was also the uncle of the Polish film and television actor Jerzy Moes.

In 1939, after the German invasion of Poland, Moes fought as an officer in the ranks of the Polish Army Intelligence Brigade and he was awarded the Cross of Valour. He was taken prisoner in the Battle of the Bzura and sent to Oflag, where he spent almost six years. With the establishment of the communist regime in Poland in 1945, he was deprived of his entire property. He was forced to earn his living mainly as a translator and worked at the Iranian Embassy in Warsaw.

In 1964, Moes gave an interview to Andrzej Dołegowski, the Polish translator of Mann’s works, which was published in August 1965 in the German magazine Twen, revealing that he had been the inspiration for the writer’s character Tadzio in Death in Venice:

During the last years of his life, Moes often stayed with his daughter Maria in France. He died in Warsaw and was buried in the Moes family plot in the graveyard on the hill of St Peter in Pilica, southern Poland.

References 

Gilbert Adair: The Real Tadzio: Thomas Mann's 'Death in Venice' and the Boy Who Inspired It. 2001. Carroll & Graf.

1900 births
1986 deaths
20th-century Polish nobility
Thomas Mann
Muses
Polish military personnel of World War II
Polish prisoners of war in World War II
Polish people of the Polish–Soviet War
Recipients of the Cross of Valour (Poland)